United States v. Davila, 569 U.S. 597 (2013), was a United States Supreme Court case in which the Court held that when a federal judge participates in the plea process in violation of rule 11(c) of the Federal Rules of Criminal Procedure, a guilty plea need not be vacated if the record shows prejudice to the decision to plea due to rule 11(h).

Notes

References

External links
 

2013 in United States case law
United States Supreme Court cases
United States Supreme Court cases of the Roberts Court